Gifhorn is a railway station located in Gifhorn, Germany. The station is located on the Berlin-Lehrte Railway and Braunschweig-Uelzen railway. The train services are operated by Metronom and Erixx. Gifhorn has a second station, closer to the centre, Gifhorn Stadt.

Train services
The station is serves by the following service(s):

Regional services  Hannover - Lehrte - Gifhorn - Wolfsburg
Local services  Uelzen - Wittingen - Gifhorn - Braunschweig

References

External links

Railway stations in Lower Saxony